The Rose Elf is a one act chamber opera with music and libretto by David Hertzberg, based on the fairy tale The Elf of the Rose by Hans Christian Andersen. It premiered June 6, 2018, in the Catacombs of Green-Wood Cemetery in Brooklyn, New York City, in a production directed by R. B. Schlather and conducted by Teddy Poll. The opera's debut recording was released October 31, 2020, by Meyer Media LLC (MM20044).

Roles

Instrumentation
Clarinet, horn, percussion, piano, 2 violins, viola, violoncello, bass.

Critical reception 
Of the premiere, the Observer wrote, "just about everything you want opera to be. The Rose Elf shocked, confounded, disturbed, and, in the end, exalted."

Following the premiere, WQXR named it the 'Opera Event of the Half Year', saying, "Hertzberg is a masterful dramatist... this one signals the arrival of a major compositional personality."

Opera News called the work, "a compelling and welcome addition to the operatic canon."

The Rose Elf was subsequently named among 'New York's Most Memorable Concerts of 2018' and awarded Operavore's 'Freddie' Award for Best New Opera

Recording
2020: Robert Kahn, conductor; Samantha Hankey, Sydney Mancasola, Kirk Dougherty, Andrew Bogard. Meyer Media LLC (MM20044).

References 

English-language operas
Chamber operas
One-act operas
Operas
2018 operas
Operas based on fairy tales
Operas based on works by Hans Christian Andersen